Erika Chryselle Gonzales Gancayco-Lorenzo (born September 20, 1990), better known by her stage name Erich Gonzales, is a Filipino actress. She is a contract artist of ABS-CBN's Star Magic. She started her showbiz career at the age of 14, as a contestant of the reality talent search Star Circle Quest. She came to prominence in her lead role Katorse.

After winning Star Circle Quest, she changed her last name from Gancayco to Gonzales, her mother's maiden name. Because of the start of her entertainment career, Erich finished her high school years at ABS-CBN Distance Learning Center and attended college at Trinity University of Asia, where she majored in mass communication.

Early life
The youngest of 3 siblings, Gonzales was born in Cebu City and raised in Davao City.

Career

2004–2008: Star Circle Quest and supporting roles
Her career began when she won as Grand Questor in the second season of the reality talent search Star Circle Quest in 2005, and later becoming a part of ABS-CBN's home-based training and management program, Star Magic after her win. Erich became a familiar face as she appeared in numerous shows and dramas as a supporting actress, such as Dorina in the hit phenomenon TV series Mga Anghel Na Walang Langit. She also starred in the teen-oriented show Abt Ur Luv as Waling-Waling and as Ella in the drama series Pieta. She then showed her versatility in acting when she played Camille in the drama series Sana Maulit Muli opposite to Gerald Anderson with Kim Chiu as the supporting cast and antagonist later in the end became kind throughout every episode.

2009: Katorse
Gonzales rose to fame in 2009 when she played the protagonist, a teenage mother in the TV adaptation of the 1980 film Katorse, alongside Enchong Dee, Ejay Falcon, and Xian Lim. The series became a top rater and was critically acclaimed, catapulting Erich to stardom, earning her the title Breakthrough Star of 2009 by the Sunday entertainment talk show, The Buzz.

In the same year, she made her film debut in her first digital movie (Indie film) Paano Ko Sasabihin? with her perennial partner, Enchong Dee. The film became an official entry to the 2009 Cinema One Originals Film Festival and was a recipient of several awards in the festival.

2010–2011: Career expansion
In 2010, following the success of Katorse, she landed her second lead role in the TV series Tanging Yaman alongside her Katorse co-stars Enchong Dee and Ejay Falcon. The series was one of ABS-CBN's offerings for the 60th Celebration of Filipino Soap Operas. While the series was still airing, Erich had begun working for her third series project, Magkaribal. The show was highly acclaimed and is now regarded as Philippines' First Fashionserye (first fashion TV series).

After an impressive back-to-back hit TV series, Erich signed an exclusive two-year contract with Star Cinema, poising her to prove her box-office draw. Later that year, the hit love team of Erich and Enchong starred in their first mainstream movie, I Do under Star Cinema. She also became the lead cast of the indie film Noy with Coco Martin, which became the Philippines' entry in the 83rd Academy Awards in Best Foreign Language Film category.

In the same year, Erich was also given the opportunity to be one of the main hosts in the youth variety show, Shoutout!, which featured teen stars.

The Filipino adaptation of Maria La Del Barrio was the highlight for Erich in 2011. The series became a Twitter trending royalty as it trended locally and worldwide on and off throughout its run. It was also extended twice as its ratings remained consistently high.

In December 2011, Erich's indie film, Pinta*Kasi was finally screened in theaters as part of the 2011 Metro Manila Film Festival. The film won Best Picture in the New Wave Section and Best Actor (same category) for co-star, JM De Guzman. The said film was also invited to Beijing and Hawaiian film festivals for its "strength of word of mouth buzz and its hip hop elements."

But the biggest news for 2011 came in October when it was officially announced that Erich will be starring with Thai heartthrob and Asia's Superstar, Mario Maurer in a film tentatively titled Suddenly It's Magic.

In March 2017, Erich was welcomed as the newest brand ambassador for MySlim, a popular slimming drink in the Philippines.

2012–present: Successful movies and Juan dela Cruz
As Maria La Del Barrio ended with a high note in March 2012, Erich's other indie movie was released. She starred in a horror movie alongside Derek Ramsay, titled Corazon: Ang Unang Aswang and opened to a very warm audience reception. Earning seven million pesos on its first day, the movie became the Highest Grossing Digital Film. As a result, Star Cinema crowned Erich with the title Philippine Box Office Queen for Digital Independent Film.

In May 2012, Erich began working on her biggest project of the year, Suddenly It's Magic, a film with Thai actor Mario Maurer under Star Cinema. With the collaboration of Filipino and Thai production teams, actors, and actresses, the film is the first Filipino-Thai movie created between the two countries. The official movie was released on October 31, 2012, in the Philippines, March 14, 2013, in Thailand, and March 28, 2013, in Cambodia.

The latter part of 2012 was a hectic one for Erich. She made her debut appearance in Canada as part of the TFC Liga Kapamilya Basketball Finals at the end of August. She wowed the crowds in Oshawa, Ontario and Burnaby, British Columbia. Then, on November 3, she entertained Kapamilyas in Los Angeles for the Star Magic 20 Tour. Erich capped her year with the release of her fourth indie film, Mariposa sa Hawla ng Gabi with director Richard V. Somes.

After having a successful love team with Enchong Dee and team-up with Mario Maurer, she appears once again in the weeknight primetime slot, as she becomes part of the biggest television series of ABS-CBN for 2013. Titled Juan dela Cruz, she is paired up once again with Noy co-star and Prince of Teleserye Coco Martin as his leading lady. The show immediately became number one in national TV ratings during its pilot episode and is expected to continue throughout its run.

In 2014, Erich Gonzales and Enchong Dee had a reunion movie project with JC De Vera in Once A Princess directed by Laurice Guillen. She played her most challenging role to show her versatility as the second wife in the upcoming Primetime teleserye hit Koreanovela-remake series Two Wives, opposite to Jason Abalos, alongside Kaye Abad, Patrick Garcia and Rayver Cruz. After the movie Once A Princess, she will be reunited to JC De Vera in MMFF's Shake, Rattle & Roll XV "AhaS". She will portray a new challenging character as a Twin-snake in a Mall which again show her versatility as a brilliant actress of her generation.

In 2015, Gonzales had a Special Finale Participation on the highly anticipated TV Series, Forevermore as Alexandra "Alex" Pante.

In July 2017, a young businessman named Xian Gaza sent a coffee invite to actress Erich Gonzales via billboard at the corner of Recto Avenue and Morayta, in the city of Manila.

Gonzales eventually declined the offer, saying that after she saw Gaza posting lengthy messages on social media, she became uncomfortable and decided not to meet him. She added that a guy does not have to be over the top to get her attention.

Filmography

Film

Television

Awards and nominations

References

External links
 
 

1990 births
Living people
Filipino child actresses
Filipino film actresses
Filipino television actresses
Filipino female models
Star Circle Quest participants
Star Circle Quest winners
Star Magic
People from Davao City
Actresses from Davao del Sur
Visayan people
ABS-CBN personalities
GMA Network personalities
TV5 (Philippine TV network) personalities